Pinacyanol is a cyanine dye.  It is an organic cation, typically isolated as the chloride or iodide salts.  The blue dye is prepared from 2-methylquinoline by quaternization with ethyl chloride or ethyl iodide.  Condensation with formaldehyde results in coupling. Subsequent oxidation of the leuco intermediate gives the dye.  Pinacyanol is a prototypical cyanine dye that was widely used as a sensitizer in electrophotography. Its biological properties have also been investigated widely.

References

Quinolines